London Buses route 96 is a Transport for London contracted bus route in London and Kent, England. Running between Woolwich and Bluewater Shopping Centre, it is operated by Stagecoach London.

History

Route 96 was a tram line running between Woolwich and Dartford. On 10 November 1935, it was replaced, along with several other tram routes, by trolleybus route 696 operating out of Bexleyheath garage. Route 696 was replaced by motor bus route 96 on 4 March 1959. It was extended from Dartford to Bluewater Shopping Centre on 16 March 1999. Because this stretch is outside Greater London, it runs express between these points.

On 31 July 2006, a vehicle operating route 96 bound for Bluewater caught fire in Dartford. In 2013, a report from the London Assembly found the route to be among the ten most crowded in London.

There were proposals as early as 2011 to alter the route to run via Darent Valley Hospital. However, this change was delayed as it was deemed necessary to use the Fastrack Busway, and Kent County Council had refused to allow route 96 to use it. The route alteration was finally implemented on 16 December 2017.

Having been operated by Bexleybus and Kentish Bus, it has been operated by Selkent out of Plumstead garage since January 1999.

Current route
Route 96 operates via these primary locations:
 Woolwich Town Centre for Woolwich and Woolwich Arsenal stations   
 Plumstead High Street for Plumstead station 
 Plumstead Common
 East Wickham, Upper Wickham Lane
 Welling High Street
 Crook Log
 Bexleyheath Shopping Centre
 Crayford, London Road
 Crayford Town Centre
 Dartford, Dartford Road
 Dartford station  for Dartford Town Centre
 Darent Valley Hospital 
 Bluewater Shopping Centre 

Between Dartford and Bluewater, route 96 operates as an express service, stopping only at Darent Valley Hospital.

Previous use
The 96 route number has also been used for a non-related route in Chelsea. This route was withdrawn in the late 1950s.

References

External links

Timetable

Bus routes in London
Transport in the London Borough of Bexley
Transport in the Borough of Dartford
Transport in the Royal Borough of Greenwich
Transport in Kent